Storm & Stress (alternately styled as Storm&Stress or Stormandstress) were an American experimental rock band formed in Pittsburgh and later based in Chicago. The band's name is derived from the German literary movement Sturm und Drang. Storm & Stress initially consisted of bassist George Draguns, drummer Kevin Shea and vocalist/guitarist Ian Williams. Eric Emm later replaced Draguns on bass.

Storm & Stress released two full-length albums on Touch and Go Records and toured the United States and Europe. Storm & Stress has been inactive since 2000; it is likely that the band broke up as part of the fallout of the November 2000 breakup of Don Caballero, of which Williams and Emm were also members.

Ian Williams now plays guitar and keyboards in the band Battles; Eric Emm sings and plays guitar for Tanlines; Kevin Shea has made significant contributions to the experimental and free jazz scenes in New York, most notably with Talibam!. In 2014 Kevin Shea, George Draguns and guitarist Nick Millevoi released an album as Form and Mess; an obvious allusion to Shea and Draguns' former band Storm & Stress.

Discography
Storm & Stress (1997, Touch and Go)
Under Thunder and Fluorescent Lights (2000, Touch and Go)

References

External links 
 
 

Musical groups from Chicago
Touch and Go Records artists